The Common Lodging Houses Act 1851 (14 & 15 Vict c 28), sometimes (like the Labouring Classes Lodging Houses Act 1851) known as the Shaftesbury Act, is an Act of the Parliament of the United Kingdom. It is one of the principal British Housing Acts. It gave boroughs and vestries the power to supervise public health regarding 'common lodging houses' for the poor and migratory people. The Act takes its name from Anthony Ashley-Cooper, 7th Earl of Shaftesbury.

Further reading
Robert Anstruther Strange. Lodging Houses Acts. The Common Lodging Houses Act, 1851, and the Labouring Classes Lodging Houses Act, 1851. Shaw and Sons. Fetter Lane, London. 1851. Google Books.
"The Common Lodging Houses Act, 1851". Halsbury's Statutes of England. (The Complete Statutes of England). First Edition. Butterworth & Co (Publishers) Ltd. Bell Yard, Temple Bar, London. 1930. Volume 11. Page 882.
The Statutes: Second Revised Edition. Printed under the authority of HMSO. London. 1894. Volume 8. Pages 805 to 807.
The Statutes: Revised Edition. Printed by George Edward Eyre and William Spottiswoode, printers to the Queen's most excellent majesty. 1877. Volume 11. Pages 16 to 18.
William Paterson (ed). "Common Lodging Houses Act". The Practical Statutes of the Session 1851. John Crockford. Essex Street, Strand, London. 1851. Pages 43 to 53.
George Laurence Gomme and Seager Berry. London Statutes. 1907. Volume 1. Pages 183 to 184.
William Golden Lumley and Edmund Lumley. "Common Lodging Houses". The New Sanitary Laws. Second Edition. Shaw and Sons. Fetter Lane, London. 1871. Pages 362 to 366.
Arthur John Wood (ed). "Common Lodging Houses". A Selection of Acts for the Use of the Metropolitan Police. Printed by George Edward Eyre and William Spottiswoode for HMSO. 1862. Pages 243 to 247.

References

United Kingdom Acts of Parliament 1851
Acts of the Parliament of the United Kingdom concerning England and Wales